Gwangju Jeil High School is a boys' high school in Gwangju, South Korea. It has 840 students in grades 10, 11, and 12. The school is considered to be one of the most prestigious high schools in Gwangu.

Historically, the school is known as the birthplace of the Gwangju Student Independence Movement, a series of protests in 1929 against the 1910–1945 Japanese rule of Korea. 

The school is also known for its baseball team, and has won the Cheongryonggi championship multiple times. A number of its alumni have gone on to play professional baseball in Korea, Japan, and the United States. One of the school's most famous graduates is Sun Dong-yol, considered one of the greatest pitchers in the history of Korean professional baseball. Another graduate, Lee Jong-beom, nicknamed "Son of the Wind," is widely considered one of the best five-tool players in Korean baseball history, and the best all-around KBO player of the 1990s. As of 2015, the school had produced more Major League Baseball players — four — than any other high school in Asia, including Osaka, Japan's famous PL Gakuen High School.

History 
Gwangju Public High School was established in 1920. The Gwangju Ilgo school baseball club was established in 1923.

In late October 1929, students from the school helped spark demonstrations against Japanese rule. The Gwangju Student Independence Movement Memorial, housed in a park on the school's campus, was built in 1954 to commemorate the student independence movement. The Gwangju Student Independence Movement Memorial History Museum was built in 1997; it was designated as the 26th Gwangju Metropolitan City Monument on April 30, 1999. 

Kim Yong-un, a mathematician, philosopher, and critic of civilizations, taught math at the school in the 1950s.

Notable alumni

Professional baseball players 
 Byung-hyun Kim (1997)
 Hee-seop Choi (1998)
 Jae Weong Seo (1996)
 Jeong Ju-hu ( 2013)
 Jung-ho Kang ( 2005)
 Lee Jong-beom ( 1988)
 Lee Kang-chul ( 1984)
 Park Jae-hong ( 1991)
 Seo Geon-chang ( 2006)
 Sun Dong-yol (1981)

Other professions 
 Kim Sang-gon (1968) — politician
 Noh Hyeong-ouk ( 1980) — activist and government official
 Sung Won Sohn (1962) — economist

References

External links 
 Gwangju Jeil (Gwangju, South Korea) Baseball Players, Baseball-Reference.com

1920 establishments in Korea
Boys' schools in South Korea
Educational institutions established in 1920
High schools in South Korea
Schools in Gwangju